"Air Force Ones" is a song by American rapper Nelly, from his second album Nellyville . It was released on November 4, 2002, and features fellow St. Lunatics rappers Kyjuan, Ali and Murphy Lee. The song was the third top 5 hit from Nellyville on the U.S. Billboard Hot 100, peaking at number 3. Its video, whose exteriors were shot at the SE corner of Delmar and Westgate in University City, Missouri, featured St. Louis professional athletes Marshall Faulk, Torry Holt, D'Marco Farr, Ray Lankford, and Ozzie Smith, and hip hop artists Big Tymers and WC.

Meaning
The Nike Air Force One is a type of shoe. In the song, Nelly and the St. Lunatics each brag about their usage and opinions of the shoes.

Remix
The official remix was included on Nelly's remix album Da Derrty Versions: The Reinvention and David Banner's album MTA2: Baptized in Dirty Water. It features the St. Lunatics on the 1st part of the chorus, David Banner, and 8Ball. David Banner is also the producer of the remix.

Track listings
US promo CD single
 "Air Force Ones" (clean radio edit) — 4:31
 "Air Force Ones" (clean album version) — 5:04
 "Air Force Ones" (instrumental) — 5:04

'''US 12" single (double A-side with "Dilemma")
 "Dilemma" (clean) — 4:49
 "Dilemma" (dirty) — 4:49
 "Dilemma" (instrumental) — 4:49
 "Air Force Ones" (clean) — 5:04
 "Air Force Ones" (dirty) — 5:04
 "Air Force Ones" (instrumental) — 5:04

Charts

Weekly charts

Year-end charts

Release history

References 

2002 singles
2002 songs
Nelly songs
Songs written by Nelly
Universal Records singles